Kirgiz-Miyaki (Qırğıź-Miäkä) is a rural locality (a selo) and the administrative center of Miyakinsky District of the Republic of Bashkortostan, Russia.  Population: 

There are two secondary schools, one movie theater, a palace of culture, a milk factory, and a fish company in the village.

The village was founded in the 18th century.

References

Rural localities in Miyakinsky District